Joseph A. Kinney III is an American baseball coach and former outfielder. He played college baseball at Lehigh for coach Stan Schultz from 1985 to 1988. He then served as the head coach of the Lafayette Leopards (2000–2020).

Playing career
Raised in Maplewood, New Jersey, Kinney attended Columbia High School, where he played baseball and football before graduating in 1984. Upon graduation from high school, Kinney enrolled at Lehigh University and majored in economics.

As a freshman at Lehigh University in 1985, Kinney had a .332 batting average, a .402 on-base percentage (OBP) and a .441 SLG.

As a sophomore in 1986, Kinney batted .274 with a .387 SLG, 2 home run, and 6 RBIs.

In the 1987 season as a junior, Kinney hit 2 home runs and had 10 hits.

Kinney served as a team captain as a senior.

Coaching career
On September 19, 1999, Kinney was named the head coach of the Lafayette Leopards baseball program.

Kinney's 2007 team won the Patriot League as well as the 2007 Patriot League baseball tournament, the team's first NCAA Regional berth since 1990.

Kinney announced the fall of 2019, that the 2020 season would be his last before retiring.

Head coaching record

References

External links
Lafayette Leopards bio

Living people
Baseball outfielders
Baseball players from New Jersey
Columbia High School (New Jersey) alumni
Lehigh Mountain Hawks baseball players
High school baseball coaches in the United States
Lehigh Mountain Hawks baseball coaches
Navy Midshipmen baseball coaches
Lafayette Leopards baseball coaches
People from Maplewood, New Jersey
Sportspeople from Essex County, New Jersey
Year of birth missing (living people)